Nambardaar a head of the village who is responsible for certifying land ownership records for governmental purposes, especially in India and Pakistan. This practice dates back to British rule in India. The Nambardaar is also responsible for certifying birth and death. He collects chula tax (family tax) or Abiana for revenue department in Pakistan from the villagers/farmers and deposits it to the government. The Nambardaar keeps a fixed percentage of the collection as his income. Some people use the term Lambardaar for the same purpose.

See also
Patwari
Tehsildar

References

Further reading
India's princely states: people, princes and colonialism By Waltraud Ernst, Biswamoy Pati 
The Land Systems of British India: Vol 3 by Baden Henry Baden-Powell 

Local government in India
Hindi words and phrases
Local government officers in India